The New Bern Metropolitan Statistical Area, as defined by the United States Census Bureau, is an area consisting of three counties in the Inner Banks region of eastern North Carolina, anchored by the city of New Bern.  The designation of the area was changed from Micropolitan to Metropolitan in 2013.

As of the 2000 census, the μSA had a population of 114,751 (though a July 1, 2009 estimate placed the population at 121,022).

Counties
Craven
Jones
Pamlico

Communities
Places with more than 20,000 inhabitants
Havelock 
New Bern (Principal city)
Places with 5,000 to 10,000 inhabitants
James City (census-designated place)
Places with 1,000 to 5,000 inhabitants
Brices Creek (census-designated place)
Fairfield Harbour (census-designated place)
Maysville
Neuse Forest (census-designated place)
River Bend
Trent Woods
Places with 500 to 1,000 inhabitants
Alliance
Bayboro
Grantsboro 
Oriental
Vanceboro
Places with less than 500 inhabitants
Craeberne Forrest

Demographics
As of the census of 2000, there were 114,751 people, 43,821 households, and 31,724 families residing within the MSA. The racial makeup of the MSA was 69.49% White, 26.03% African American, 0.43% Native American, 0.85% Asian, 0.05% Pacific Islander, 1.64% from other races, and 1.51% from two or more races. Hispanic or Latino of any race were 3.60% of the population.

The median income for a household in the MSA was $33,644, and the median income for a family was $39,804. Males had a median income of $29,544 versus $20,764 for females. The per capita income for the MSA was $17,448.

See also
North Carolina census statistical areas

References

 
Geography of Craven County, North Carolina
Geography of Pamlico County, North Carolina
Geography of Jones County, North Carolina